Daniel Sliwinski (born 4 April 1990) is a British former breaststroke swimmer.

Sliwinski, born in Preston, began swimming at the age of five. He attended Bolton School and with his junior swimming accomplishments earned a full scholarship to Indiana University in the United States.

A Stockport ITC swimmer, Sliwinski won both the 50 and 100 metre breaststroke events at the 2008 Youth World Championships. In 2010 he was a member of England's bronze medal-winning  medley relay team at the Delhi Commonwealth Games. He is a former British record holder in the 100 metre breaststroke. In 2012 he won the 100 metre breaststroke at the British Championships to earn a place on the London Olympic team, but had to withdraw a month before the games due to a shoulder tendon injury.

References

External links

1990 births
Living people
British male breaststroke swimmers
English male swimmers
People educated at Bolton School
Indiana Hoosiers men's swimmers
Sportspeople from Preston, Lancashire
Commonwealth Games medallists in swimming
Commonwealth Games bronze medallists for England
Medallists at the 2010 Commonwealth Games
Swimmers at the 2010 Commonwealth Games